Heavy Crown is the debut album by British/American supergroup Last in Line. It was released on February 19, 2016. Its lead single, "Devil in Me", was released on November 17, 2015. The album was produced by bass player Jeff Pilson and co-written by the four band members.

This was the last album on which Jimmy Bain played the bass guitar before his death on January 23, 2016, less than a month prior to the album's release.

The young boy on the cover is Andrew Freeman's son Jacob. []

Track listing

Personnel
Last in Line
 Andrew Freeman – vocals
 Vivian Campbell – guitar
 Jimmy Bain – bass
 Vinny Appice – drums

References

2016 debut albums
Last in Line albums
Frontiers Records albums
Albums produced by Jeff Pilson